The High Command is a 1937 British drama film directed by Thorold Dickinson and starring Lionel Atwill, Lucie Mannheim and James Mason.

It was shot at Ealing Studios and on location on the Gold Coast. The film's sets were designed by the art director Holmes Paul. It is an adaptation of the 1936 novel The General Goes Too Far by Lewis Robinson.

Plot
This is the tale of an English officer who murders a man in Ireland for chivalrous reasons.  Years later, he has risen to the rank of Major-General, and is stationed in West Africa.  There, his old crime is discovered, and he allows himself to be murdered rather than involve his daughter in his own disgrace.

Cast
Lionel Atwill as Maj. Gen. Sir John Sangye, VC
Lucie Mannheim as Diana Cloam
Steven Geray as Martin Cloam
James Mason as Capt. Heverell
Leslie Perrins as Maj. Carson
Allan Jeayes as H.E., the Governor
Michael Lambart as Lorne
Kathleen Gibson as Belinda
Tom Gill as Daunt
Wally Patch as Crawford
Archibald Batty as Capt. Coates (the prosecutor)
Henry Hewitt as Defence counsel
Drusilla Wills as Miss Isabella Hobson Tuff
Cyril Howe as Julius Caesar (servant)
Evan Thomas as Chief Justice
Aubrey Pollock as Judge Advocate
Deering Wells as Escort
Philip Strange as Maj. Challoner
Frank Atkinson as Corporal
Skelton Knaggs as Fazerack

Reception
The Sunday Times wrote of this film: "Its avoidance of reality and its slowness make it a first-class soporific in this sultry weather."  Despite the film's faults, the novelist and author Graham Greene opined that the directing work by Thorold Dickinson made the film much better than it otherwise would have been. Greene also pointed out that Fanfare was a newly emerging British film company that was constrained by its budget, and that it still managed to use "lyric imagination" to produce memorable scenes well designed to portray the degree of "human crisis" especially at the climax when the General's secret is revealed. Greene described the "glib" review from The Sunday Times as "rather shocking" in light of the production's efforts with their financial limitations.

References

External links

The High Command (1937) at BFI Film Forever

British drama films
1937 drama films
1937 films
British black-and-white films
Ealing Studios films
Films based on British novels
Films directed by Thorold Dickinson
Films set in the British Empire
Films set in Africa
Films set in Ireland
Films set in 1921
Films shot in Ghana
Films shot in Nigeria
1930s English-language films
1930s British films